SBS PopAsia is an Australian digital radio station that broadcasts music, most notably from East Asia and Southeast Asia, on digital radio, online and on mobile devices. The station originated as a two-hour segment on SBS youth radio programme Alchemy before launching as a stand alone digital radio station in 2010.

A television program of the same name was also broadcast on SBS and later SBS Viceland from 2011 to 2018, presenting back-to-back Asian Pop music videos. It was hosted by Jamaica de la Cruz until 2016, with Andy Trieu taking over as host until the show ended in 2018.

PopAsia fans are called PopAsians.

History
SBS PopAsia began as a weekly two-hour segment on the SBS youth radio programme, Alchemy, as the Asian Pop Show. Due to growing popularity and increasing online fan engagement SBS PopAsia was launched as a 24-hour digital radio show in 2010.

In late 2011, a television program of the same name debuted on SBS's main free-to-air television channel in a two-hour timeslot from on Sunday mornings. In 2013, the program was extended to three-and-a-half hours of prime-time broadcast across Saturday and Sunday evenings on SBS Viceland (formerly SBS2). In 2014, it reverted to its original 2 hour timeslot at 9am on Sundays. From March 13, 2016, it changed to a one-hour show on Sundays 10am-11am on SBS Viceland. PopAsia aired its final episode on 8 July 2018.

Radio
SBS PopAsia began transmitting in 2010. The station is available on DAB, the SBS mobile application, and channel 307 on Freeview across Australia.

SBS PopAsia hosts a variety of segments and shows on digital radio:

Current segments 
 Breakfast Requests: Playing fan requests made through Facebook, Twitter or the request phone line.
 BTS Hit Zone: Broadcasts music from prominent South Korean boy band BTS.
 C-pop Central: Focuses on Mandopop and Cantopop.
 Filipino Buzz: Broadcasts mainly OPM and Pinoy pop.
 Girl Group Alumni: This segment focuses on recent releases, as well as hits, from girl groups.
 J-pop Nation: Mainly airs recent J-pop releases.
 K-drama OST: This segment plays music from Korean drama soundtracks, including classics as well as new releases.
 K-Wave: Mainly airs music from South Korea.
 V-Pop Vibes: Focuses on V-pop and other music from Vietnam.
 PopAsia Party: Every Friday and Saturday night the station plays a variety of upbeat Asian pop music for a party atmosphere.
 SBS PopAsia's Top 30 Countdown: This segment counts down the most popular Asian pop songs of the week.
 Sunday Night J-rock: Airing on Sunday nights, this segment is dedicated to Japanese rock, metal and other heavy music.
 The Anime Hour: Airs theme tunes from anime.
 The Old School Arvo: Plays past music from various artists.
 We Love Boybands: Mainly airs music from Asian boy bands.

Former segments/shows 
Beats & Bars: Hip-Hop

An hour of hip-hop, rap and R&B music encompassing Asian countries including South Korea, China, Japan, Vietnam, Malaysia, Indonesia and more.

Boyband Friday

SBS PopAsia formerly aired music from boy bands for the entire day every Friday.

The New Music Show
Andy Trieu shares the latest song releases and pop culture news, and also interviews a variety of Asian pop artist

Live@5 Show
Between 2011-2014, fans could tune into the digital radio show between 5-7pm where co-hosts Jamaica dela Cruz and MegaMatt would count down the biggest Asian Pop hits in Australia as voted on Twitter and Facebook. The show was replaced by Hashtag Hits in 2014 which introduced a system of live voting through hashtags on Twitter.

Hashtag Hits
The Hashtag Hits show commenced in 2014. Every weekday, regular votes through Twitter and Facebook finalised the top 8 songs and a challenger. Live voting opened at 4.30pm (AEST) where listeners tweeted or posted on the Facebook wall the #Hashtag of their favourite song from the top 9. The concept of Titanium Status was introduced in June 2014 where when a song has reached number one for eight consecutive days, it becomes titanium. Despite anticipation that EXO's Overdose would be the first song to reach Titanium Status, in fact label mate Super Junior M succeeded with their song Swing. The other Titanium songs included GOT7's A, Beast's Good Luck (three times), Infinite's Last Romeo, Super Junior's Mamacita (two times) and Infinite's Back. All of the songs that have reached Titanium status are from Korean male groups rather than female groups.

Eat Your Kimchi
YouTubers Simon and Martina or Eat Your Kimchi, had a radio show on SBS PopAsia radio every Friday 7-8pm AEST. They talked about K-Pop and more largely Korean culture. Content covered include issues similar to theTL;DR's on their YouTube channel such as plastic surgery and the FIFA World Cup.

Prince Mak Hour
Australian member of K-pop boyband JJCC began hosting his own 1 hour radio show from 2015 on Tuesdays at 8pm. He played Asian Pop music and talked about his life as an Asian popstar

Television

The SBS PopAsia television show launched on 7 September 2011 on SBS, airing 8.30am-10.30am (AEST) on Sundays. Growing popularity saw an additional episode was added on Mondays at 5pm. With the relaunch of the SBS Viceland (formerly SBS2) channel to focus on younger audiences, SBS PopAsia moved to the channel in 2013 and was broadcast every Sunday afternoon from 4-6pm, but was later changed to 9-11am. The show aired its final episode on July 8, 2018.

The show was rated PG and hence positioned the show as an accessible, family-friendly television programme. The previous weekend's episode could be accessed on the PopAsia website or on SBS on Demand for 7 days after the episode aired on television.

Audience interaction
The show debuted by displaying Tweets and Facebook messages at regular intervals throughout the show. However it was replaced by exclusively showing displays real-time audience tweets.

Advertisements
Advertisements relevant to those interested in Asian culture were sometimes played in the ad breaks. For example, the Korean Tourism Office aired videos such as PSY's "Wiki Korea" tourism project.

Segments

Three-in-a-row
The goal of this game was to guess the common theme between the three Asian Pop videos that are shown. Viewers were encouraged to play along by tweeting or posting their guesses. Previous themes included the beach, vampires, swirly lollipops and Australian Asian Pop stars. SBS PopAsia also encouraged viewers to submit their own three-in-a-row.

Double Play
Every week, the SBS PopAsia gave PopAsians the option of choosing which of two artists should have two of their music videos played in the next episode. The winning artist was chosen through voting on Twitter and Facebook.

PopAsia 101
PopAsia 101s used to be broadcast weekly on PopAsia. This involved presenter 'PopAgent' Jay K, presenting a different 'PopAsia 101' - a 'super-fast, pop master class' on an Asian Pop artist. These were short featurettes that provide overviews of artist' careers, songs and trivia. The segment is intended to provide viewers with a gateway to engage with the landscape of Asian pop. Popular 101s include on artists Kyary Pamyu Pamyu, 365daband and EXO. PopAsia 101s can be found on the official YouTube channel.

In addition, there are special PopAsia 101s on topics relevant to Asian Pop such as on Flash Mobs and Australian Asian Pop Tours.

 Date of release is listed as the date that the PopAsia 101 video was uploaded onto YouTube

Interviews
SBSPopAsia has hosted interviews with Asian Pop bands and artists such as BTS, EXO and Jay Chou and celebrities related to the Asian Pop industry such as YouTube stars Mychonny and Eatyourkimchi.

See Guests and interviewees section.

Video Requests
In 2012, SBS PopAsia took video requests whereby viewers could post videos on YouTube requesting a song to be played on PopAsia. The video request would then be then be played on PopAsia TV preceding the music video it was requesting.

Special episodes
When holidays and special events occur, SBS PopAsia hosts special PopAsia episodes:
New Years/New Year's Eve: For New Year's Eve, there is an extended SBSPopAsia episode with video clips until or past midnight and a New Years' countdown. New Years' greetings from Asian Pop artists are shown.
Lunar New Year
Australia Day: there is an emphasis on songs by Asian Pop idols with Australian background, such as Kimberley Chen, C-Clown's Rome and LEDApple's Hanbyul. 
Christmas: PopAsia plays Christmas and holiday-related Asian Pop songs.

Additionally, when the show first started, PopAsia used to have special episodes for certain Asian Pop artists such as SHINee.

Mobile
SBS PopAsia also has an official mobile application for both Apple iPhone and Android which can be downloaded for free from the respective platforms. The app's primary feature was the 24/7 streaming of PopAsia's digital radio station and beside each track has a track purchase button. The app also connects users to the PopAsia website and podcasts.

Podcast
PopAsia podcasts can be downloaded off the Apple iTunes store. and primarily compromises of interviews such as regular chats with blog MyKoreanHusband. Also, there is some non-Asian pop related content such as 'Top 3 movies not to miss in 2014'.

Guests and interviewees
SBS PopAsia regularly features guests on its TV, Radio and YouTube platforms. The date is in accordance to the date that the interview was uploaded onto SBS PopAsia's YouTube platform and hence may not reflect the original date of broadcast on SBS PopAsia's TV or radio platforms. Where there is not a specific interviewee, SBS PopAsia in general is specified as the interviewee.

Crayon Pop
Block B
JJCC's Prince Mak

Former on-air presenters and staff

Guest programmers

Prizes and Competitions
SBSPopAsia regularly hosts competitions which can be found on their website. Competitions can be won through entering on their website or through phoning their radio show. Prizes include concert tickets (such as to BAP, 2K13 Feel Korea Festival, signed albums and merchandise and overseas trips to Asian destinations.

Concerts and events
SBS PopAsia continues to be involved in the promotion of Asian acts coming to Australia.  In 2011 SBS PopAsia was the official Australian media partner of the 2011 Sydney K-Pop Music Fest which features artists such as SHINee, Girls' Generation and TVXQ.  PopAsia has gone on to support acts such as CNBLUE, 4Minute, J-Pop star Kyary Pamyu Pamyu and the inaugural KCON in 2017.

Coverage of concerts
SBS PopAsia has provided coverage and interviews for the following Asian Pop concerts in Australia: 
 2011 K-Pop Music Festival
 NU'EST for the 2012 K-Pop Cover Contest
 A-Mei Amazing World Tour 2012
 CNBlue Blue Moon Tour
 Wang Lee Hom Music Man Tour II
 4Minute for the 2013 K-Pop Cover Contest
 XIA Incredible Concert 2013
 Crayon Pop 2013
 Kyary Pamyu Pamyu 2014
 Jay Chou Opus Jay 2013 World Tour
 BAP Live on Earth 2014 Tour
 B1A4 Road Trip 2014

Events
SBS PopAsia have participated in events such as the Campsie Food Festival in 2011 and 2012. 
Also, they are regularly involved in events relevant to Asian culture.

Lunar New Year
 Chatswood Lunar New Year 2014
 Sydney Lunar New Year Twilight Parade 2014
 Boyfriend and JJCC K-Pop Party Carriageworks 2016

Moon Festival
Cabramatta Moon Festival in 2011, 2013 and 2014
Box Hill Moon Festival (Melbourne) in 2011 and 2013

Impact
The show is a mainstream acknowledgement of Asian popular music which was previously marginal in Australia due to an emphasis on Western music (Campbell 2010). As it is an SBS program, it has opened up the channel from a traditionally older multicultural audience to Australian youths of all backgrounds.

The show has impacted the accessibility of Asian Pop in Australia. Australia is seen as a small market to consume Asian pop but the program has been able to prove the growing demand for Asian Pop in Australia. This is evident through the increasing number of Asian pop concerts, especially K-Pop concerts in Australia.

As of January 2020, SBS PopAsia has over 1.3 million likes on Facebook, 31 million views on YouTube, 136.9K followers on Twitter, 104K subscribers on YouTube and 43K followers on Instagram.

These platforms have also become an avenue for Australian Asian Pop fans to interact with each other.

SBS PopAsia contributed to the creation of the radio apps, SBSDesi and SBSPopAraby.

Controversy
Despite promoting itself as an Asian Pop TV and radio show, the majority of music played is from South Korea and specifically from male groups. PopAsia has responded by stating that Korean pop is the most requested genre of music. It has also been pointed out that PopAsia directly violates the charter of SBS.

Awards
 Winner of Best Interactive Radio Program award at the Asia-Pacific Broadcasting Union (ABU) Awards in 2012. 
 Winner of Advertising and Communication Award and the Grand Award for all categories at the 2012 National Multicultural Marketing Awards
 Finalist for New York Festivals World's Best Radio Programs in the category of Programming Format/Best Alternative Format.

See also

 List of Australian music television shows
 List of radio stations in Australia

References

Bibliography

External links
 Official Site

Radio stations established in 2011
Special Broadcasting Service
Australian radio networks
Special Broadcasting Service original programming
Australian music television series
East Asian music
2011 Australian television series debuts
2018 Australian television series endings